Empress Dowager Nguyễn may refer to:

Lê dynasty
Nguyễn Thị Anh (1422–1459), consort of Lê Thái Tông and mother of Lê Nhân Tông
Nguyễn Thị Hằng (1441–1505), concubine of Lê Thánh Tông and mother of Lê Hiến Tông
Nguyễn Thị Ngọc Đoan (died 1799), concubine of Lê Chiêu Thống and mother of Lê Chiêu Thống

Nguyễn dynasty
Nguyễn Thị Hoàn (1736–1811), Gia Long's mother
Nguyễn Hữu Thị Nhàn (1870–1935), Khải Định's stepmother, also grand empress dowager during Bảo Đại's reign

See also
Empress Nguyễn

Nguyễn